Adriel Jared George (born 6 December 1996) is an Antiguan footballer who plays for  side Tamworth and Antigua and Barbuda, where he plays as a midfielder.

Club career

Oxford United
He made his Football League debut for Oxford United during their 1–0 defeat against Northampton Town in the 2015–16 season before being released by the club in May 2016.

Mansfield Town
He joined Mansfield Town in 2016, and played for the club's development teams. In February 2017 he joined Mickleover Sports on loan. In November 2017 he joined Hednesford Town on loan. In March 2018 he joined North Ferriby United on loan.

Chippenham Town
He signed for National League South side Chippenham Town in February 2019,

Oxford City
George moved to Oxford City on 16 December 2019.

Slough Town
George joined National League South side Slough Town on 24 September 2021, and was named as an unused substitute the following day in a National League South fixture away to Hungerford Town, with the match finishing 1-1.

AFC Rushden & Diamonds
AJ signed for Southern League Premier Division Central side AFC Rushden & Diamonds on 23 October 2021. George made his debut for AFC Rushden & Diamonds on 30 October 2021 in an FA Cup 3rd qualifying round fixture away to Matlock Town, with the home side winning the tie 2-1.

Tamworth
On 24 June 2022, AJ signed for Southern League Premier Division Central rivals Tamworth, and was reunited with his former AFC Rushden & Diamonds manager Andy Peaks.

International career
He made his international debut for Antigua and Barbuda in 2016 on 23 March in a Caribbean Cup Qualifying match against Aruba, where he also scored his first international goal.

International goals
Scores and results list Antigua and Barbuda's goal tally first.

Career statistics

Club

References

External links
 
 
 
 AJ George at Rage Online

1996 births
Living people
Antigua and Barbuda footballers
Antigua and Barbuda international footballers
AFC Rushden & Diamonds players
Association football midfielders
Banbury United F.C. players
Chippenham Town F.C. players
English Football League players
Hednesford Town F.C. players
Mansfield Town F.C. players
Mickleover Sports F.C. players
North Ferriby United A.F.C. players
Oxford City F.C. players
Oxford United F.C. players
Slough Town F.C. players
Southern Football League players
Tamworth F.C. players